Shaul is a given name and a surname which may refer to:

Given name:
 Shaul (Hebrew שָׁאוּל Šāʼûl "asked for, prayed for") the first king of Kingdom of Israel
 Shaul, a son of Simeon (son of Jacob) in Genesis
 Shaul Amor (1940-2004), Israeli politician
 Shaul Avigur (1899–1978), a founder of the Israeli Intelligence Community
 Shaul Ben-Tzvi, Hebrew name of Paul Shulman (1922-1994), second commander of the Israeli Navy
 Shaul Eisenberg (1921–1997), Jewish businessmen and billionaire
 Shaul Elovitch (born 1949), Polish-born Israeli businessman and owner of Eurocom Group
 Shaul Foguel (1931–2020), Israeli mathematician
 Shaul Gordon (born 1994), Canadian-Israeli Olympic sabre fencer
 Shaul Gutman (born 1945), Israeli academic and former politician
 Shaul Hameed Uvais Karnain (born 1962), Sri Lankan former cricketer
 Shaul Ladany (born 1936), Israeli world-record-holding racewalker, Holocaust and Munich Massacre survivor and Professor of industrial engineering
 Shaul Magid, professor of religious studies 
 Shaul Mofaz (born 1943), Israeli former soldier and politician, 16th Chief of the General Staff of the Israel Defense Forces, former Acting Prime Minister, Deputy and Vice Prime Minister and Minister of Defense
 Shaul Rosolio (1923-1992), 5th Israeli Police Commissioner (1972-1977)
 Shaul Shani (born c. 1955), Israeli billionaire investor
 Shaul Shats (born 1944), Israeli painter, printmaker and illustrator
 Shaul Stampfer (born 1948), Jewish historian
 Shaul Tchernichovsky (1875-1943), Russian-born Hebrew poet
 Shaul Yahalom (born 1947), Israeli former politician
 Shaul Yisraeli (1909–1995), rabbi of religious Zionism

Surname:
 Dror Shaul, Israeli filmmaker
 Jamie Shaul (born 1992), English rugby league player
 John Shaul (1873-1953), English recipient of the Victoria Cross

See also
 Ben Zion Abba Shaul (1924-1998), Sephardic rabbi, Torah scholar and halakhic arbiter 
 Saul (disambiguation)

References

Hebrew masculine given names